Rinorea niccolifera is a species of plant in the Violaceae family.

The plant was discovered on the island of Luzon in the Philippines, and described in 2014. It is known for its ability to bio-accumulate nickel. Specimens have been recorded with more than 18,000 µg of nickel per gram (dry weight) in their tissues, classifying it as a hyperaccumulator. It most closely resembles Rinorea bengalensis, also a known nickel hyperaccumulator.

References

Flora of the Philippines
Plants described in 2014
niccolifera